The blessing or wedding of same-sex marriages and same-sex unions is an issue about which leaders of Christian churches are in ongoing disagreement. Traditionally, Christianity teaches that homosexual acts are sinful and that holy matrimony can only exist between two persons of the opposite sex. These disagreements are primarily centered on the interpretation of various scripture passages related to homosexuality, sacred tradition, and in some churches on varying understandings of homosexuality in terms of psychology, genetics and other scientific data. While various church bodies have widely varying practices and teachings, individual Christians of every major tradition are involved in practical (orthopraxy) discussions about how to respond to the issue.

Terminology

Same-sex union
Same-sex marriage

Theological views of those who support same-sex unions and/or marriages
Those Christians and churches which support blessing of same-sex unions do so from several perspectives:
 It is an affirmative good that stands alongside straight marriage and committed monastic celibacy as a revelation of God's self in the world.
 The logical coherence of the core Christian doctrines such as the Trinity, the Incarnation, the Resurrection and the Ascension is improved through the integration of gay marriage into the Christian conception of marriage.
 Our understanding of marriage as a metaphor of Christ's relationship with the Church is strengthened by assimilating gay marriage into that metaphor.
 Some scholars maintain that scripture in the original languages contains no prohibition of homosexuality, but does record same-sex marriage. "But if we take a closer look, reading the scripture in the original Hebrew and Greek, we discover that God never condemned homosexuality, and that same-sex marriage existed in Bible times." "To tell a homosexual that the Bible is Good News, (but that) it says that their ability to love on a one-to-one basis (mate level) means they are sinful and perverted in God's eyes is a gross contradiction in terms. What's more, God is not saying this to gay people. God's Word is this: For God so loved the world that He gave His only begotten Son that whosoever believeth in Him should not perish, but have everlasting life. (John 3:16, KJV). And that is the Good News for modern gays."
 The Biblic references to homosexuality were uttered in the context of promiscuous same-sex practices of Hellenistic cultures (Paul) and cultures surrounding the people of Israel (Deut).  This kind of sex without love was often practiced in lieu of going to female prostitutes, also by heterosexual men.  It is a discriminating misconception of our times to transfer that prohibition of such promiscuous practice without love to what we discuss here: durable, long term, selective same-sex unions.

Churches favorable to same-sex union and/or same-sex marriage

Episcopalian polities

Anglicanism

In 2004, the then Archbishop of Canterbury, Rowan Williams, asked the Lambeth Commission on Communion to produce a report looking into the legal and theological implications flowing from decisions related to homosexuality that were apparently threatening the Anglican Communion, including decisions relating to the blessing of same-sex unions. Once published the Windsor Report led to the calling by the Lambeth Commission for a moratorium on the blessing of same-sex unions, and recommended that bishops who have authorised such rites in the United States and Canada "be invited to express regret that the proper constraints of the bonds of affection were breached by such authorisation." The report was roundly condemned by supporters of the gay and lesbian community, as well as by a number of theologians for its partiality. To date, "the more liberal provinces that are open to changing Church doctrine on marriage in order to allow same-sex unions include Brazil, Canada, New Zealand, Scotland, South India, South Africa, the US and Wales".

Anglican Church of Canada
The General Synod of the Anglican Church of Canada in 2004 voted to defer a decision of same-sex blessings until 2007, but also to "Affirm the integrity and sanctity of committed adult same-sex relationships". In 2007, a resolution enabling diocesan bishops to authorize the blessing of same-gender unions narrowly failed, but a statement adopted by General Synod in 2010 "acknowledge[d] diverse pastoral practices as dioceses respond to their own missional contexts," effectively devolving decisions about blessings to local dioceses.

The Anglican Church of Canada does not distinguish theologically between a marriage solemnized in church and a civil marriage subsequently blessed by a priest. Currently, three dioceses – New Westminster, Niagara, and Montréal – extend the blessing of civil marriages to same-sex couples. Procedures for blessings are in development in Ottawa and Toronto. In 2010 the General Synod of the Anglican Church of Canada voted to study a proposal to bless only those marriages that have been civilly registered, even where marriage is reserved to heterosexual couples, abrogating the role of clergy as delegates of the provincial registrar altogether.

The blessing of same-sex unions became a subject of media attention in the Vancouver area in May, 2003 when Bishop Michael Ingham of the Anglican Diocese of New Westminster announced that he had given priests in some parishes the authority to bless gay and lesbian unions. Bishop Ingham issued a rite of blessing of people in committed same-sex unions on May 23, 2003. This was done in response to requests by three consecutive Diocesan Synods, culminating in June, 2002.  The diocese considers that the blessing of same-sex couples is one part of their work of community outreach and care for parishioners. The blessing is a way that some priests use to ensure that homosexual people who seek to be included in the Anglican Communion feel safe and respected. The blessing is a "pastoral tool".
Some priests in some parishes (six out of 80) bless permanent faithful relationships. Permission is granted by the bishop only when a priest requests it, and a parish has decided by majority vote, that they want to be a place of blessing. Ingham says of the practice: I insist only that those on all sides of the issue respect one another and that everyone should maintain the order of the church. Our goal in the Anglican Church in the Greater Vancouver area is to be a church that accommodates differences.

In 2009, the Anglican Diocese of Niagara in southwestern Ontario became the second diocese to authorize the blessing of same-sex unions when Bishop Michael Bird approved a gender-neutral rite for the blessing of civil marriages. The rite was permitted for use in consultation with the diocesan bishop beginning September 1, 2009.

In 2009, the Bishop of the Anglican Diocese of Ottawa authorized the blessing of same-sex unions in a single parish: the Church of St John the Evangelist. Rather than issuing a specific rite, Bishop Chapman authorized an existing rite already in use for the blessing of civil marriages between opposite-sex couples.

In 2010, the Rt Rev'd Barry Clarke, Bishop of the Anglican Diocese of Montreal, authorized the blessing of same-sex unions. He issued a rite and guidelines to permit the blessing of civil marriages regardless of the gender of the spouses. The rite had been adapted from an existing rite already in use for the blessing of civil marriages between opposite-sex couples.

A limited number of parishes in the Anglican Diocese of Toronto have been authorized to bless same-sex unions. Rather than crafting a specific rite of blessing, the Archbishop of Toronto issued guidelines setting rules and restrictions on blessings. Blessings must not resemble too closely a marriage rite, with the specific proviso that no form of blessing used for marriage in the official rites of the Anglican Church of Canada or other parts of the Anglican Communion may be used with same-sex couples.

On July 12, 2016, the General Synod voted in favour of same-sex marriage. The Dioceses of Ottawa and Niagara, which already provide blessing rites, have announced that they will begin allowing same-sex marriages.

Episcopal Church in the USA
At its triennial General Convention in 1976, the Episcopal Church took its first official step toward the "marriage equality" it established thirty-nine years later in its 2015 General Convention as recounted below.

1976. The 1976 General Convention resolved "that it is the sense of this General Convention that homosexual persons are children of God who have a full and equal claim with all other persons upon the love, acceptance, and pastoral concern and care of the Church."

2006. At its 2006 General Convention, the Episcopal Church rejected a resolution allowing the solemnization of same-sex marriages in Massachusetts, where same-sex marriage is recognized by civil law. However, the 2006 General Convention adopted a resolution under the title "Reaffirm Church Membership of Gay and Lesbian Persons." The resolution was in four parts:
 It reaffirmed "that gay and lesbian persons are by Baptism full members of the Body of Christ and of The Episcopal Church as 'children of God who have a full and equal claim with all other persons upon the love, acceptance, and pastoral concern and care of the Church.' "
 It apologized "on behalf of The Episcopal Church to its members who are gay or lesbian, and to lesbians and gay men outside the Church, for years of rejection and maltreatment by the Church," and recommit to "seek amendment of our life together as we ask God's help in sharing the Good News with all people."
 It pledged "to include openly gay and lesbian persons on every committee, commission or task force developed for the specific purpose of discussing issues about sexuality and request the same of our sister churches in the Anglican Communion and Anglican Communion bodies."
 Regarding membership in the Anglican Communion, it reiterated that "our baptism into Jesus Christ is inseparable from our communion with one another, and we commit ourselves to that communion despite our diversity of opinion and, among dioceses, a diversity of pastoral practice with the gay men and lesbians among us."

2009. In July 2009, the General Convention adopted a resolution allowing individual bishops to choose whether or not to allow the blessing of same-sex unions within their dioceses. The resolution was seen as a compromise between those who call for an official rite for the blessing of same-sex unions, and those who oppose any recognition of such unions. However, the resolution also left the door open for the creation of such an official rite in the future, calling on bishops to "collect and develop theological and liturgical resources" for possible use for such a purpose at the 2012 General Convention.

2012. On July 9, 2012, the Episcopal Church passed a resolution approving an official liturgy for blessing same-sex unions. This liturgy, called "The Witnessing and Blessing of a Lifelong Covenant" offers a blessing close to marriage, but the church is clear that it is not marriage. According to Rev. Ruth Meyers, chairwoman of the Standing Commission on Liturgy and Music, "There are a lot of similarities. The couple give their consent to being joined in lifelong commitment, they exchange vows. There's the possibility of exchanging rings, or, for couples who have been together for some time and already have rings, to have their rings blessed. There is a blessing over the couple. But we're clear at this point that this is not a marriage because the Episcopal Church is not in agreement in its understanding of marriage." The resolution enables priests to bestow the church's blessing on gay couples even if they live in a state where same-sex marriage is illegal; however, bishops who do not approve of the liturgy can prohibit their priests from using it. The resolution is provisional and will be reviewed in three years.

As of September 1, 2012, clergy of the Episcopal Diocese of New York have been authorized to officiate at same-sex weddings.

2015.  As the Episcopal News Service reported on the 2015 Seventy-eighth General Convention, "in the wake of the June 26 U.S. Supreme Court ruling legalizing same-sex marriage for all Americans, General Convention followed suit on July 1 with canonical and liturgical changes to provide marriage equality for Episcopalians." A canonical change eliminated "language defining marriage as between a man and a woman" and "two new marriage rites with language allowing them to be used by same-sex or opposite-sex couples." These new marriage rites are to be used "under the discretion and with the permission of the diocesan bishop." Also, "clergy retain the canonical right to refuse to officiate at any wedding."

The two new marriage rites have been made available online without charge by the Church Publishing House.  "The Witnessing and Blessing of a Marriage" (Church Publishing House, 2015) and
 "The Celebration and Blessing of a Marriage 2" (Church Publishing House, 2015)

The General Convention also approved The Witnessing and Blessing of a Lifelong Covenant: Liturgical Resources for Blessing Same-Sex Relationships for "continued use."

England
In 2013, Church of England indicated that it plans the blessing of same-sex unions. In 2023, the Church of England approved of blessings for same-sex couples following a civil marriage or civil partnership. Presently, "the Church of England does not conduct Civil Partnership Ceremonies or Same Sex Marriages but individual churches can conduct a service of thanksgiving after a ceremony."  It is, however, forbidden by law to conduct same-sex marriages within its churches. The "church allows same-sex couples to have special prayers after their wedding", but does not allow gay priests to marry. Since special prayers are allowed, congregations have published and offered "Prayers for a Same Sex Commitment" or "services of thanksgiving" for same-sex couples.

For gay clergy, the church does allow civil partnerships. The church has stated, officially, that "The Church of England recognises that same-sex relationships often embody fidelity and mutuality ... Civil partnerships enable these Christian virtues to be recognised socially and legally in a proper framework." While not officially allowed, some gay priests have converted their civil partnerships into legal marriages and have kept their positions.

In 2016, the Archbishop's Council confirmed the following:
 clergy in the Church of England are allowed to enter in same-gender civil partnerships;
 clergy are able to offer prayers in support of same-gender couples;
 churches are able to publicly welcome LGBT people;
 clergy and lay people are allowed to make arguments in favour of changing church doctrine.
In 2017, the Church of England's Diocese of Hereford voted in favor of a motion calling on the church "to create a set of formal services and prayers to bless those who have had a same-sex marriage or civil partnership." At General Synod in 2019, the Church of England announced that same-gender couples may remain and be recognized as married after a spouse has experienced gender transition provided that the spouses identified as opposite genders at the time of the marriage.

In February 2023, the Archbishop's Council allowed blessing ceremonies for same-sex marriages.

Ireland 
The Church of Ireland has facilitated a number of conversations about the subject of homosexuality. In 2002, a vicar celebrated a blessing service for a same-sex couple. In 2008, "the Church of Ireland Pensions Board ha[d] confirmed that it will treat civil partners the same as spouses." In 2011, a senior minister within the church entered into a same-sex civil partnership becoming the first to do so. The Clergy Pension Fund recognized that "the pension entitlement of a member's registered civil partner will be the same as that of a surviving spouse..." A Church of Ireland report states that "the moral logic underpinning the negative portrayal of same-sex eroticism in Scripture does not directly address committed, loving, consecrated same-sex relationships today". Currently, the church recognizes four main viewpoints ranging from opposition of same-sex unions to full acceptance of same-sex marriage. "The CoI General Synod considered blessing same-sex relationships in 2017, however it was rejected - in a relatively narrow vote." In 2022, two bishops in the Church of Ireland declared their suspport for the blessing of same-sex unions.

Scotland
In 2015, the General Synod of the Scottish Episcopal Church passed an initial vote which could eventually lead to the formal blessing of same-sex unions. Following that vote, St. Paul's Cathedral in Dundee held a special ceremony which, for the first time, blessed the union of a same-sex couple who had already been married in Dundee's registry office. In 2016, the church general synod voted to amend the marriage canon to include same-sex couples, and on 8 June 2017 it voted to allow  same-sex weddings in Scottish Episcopal churches.

On 1 August 2017, an American couple with Scottish connections were married, in "a small intimate occasion" just outside Edinburgh, which included the Eucharist as a nuptial mass, presided over by the Rector of St John's Episcopal Church, Edinburgh, making it the first Anglican same-sex wedding in the British Isles. On 16 September 2017, two men married inside St John's Episcopal Church, Edinburgh, also preside over by the Rector of St John's, making it the first same-sex marriage inside an Anglican church in the British Isles.

Wales 
Civil partnerships have been permitted for clergy since 2005. Regarding such civil unions, "The Church in Wales has no formal view on whether people in civil partnerships who are in a sexual relationship can serve as clergy. If the issue arises, it is up to the relevant Bishop to decide." The Welsh Church does not require abstinence within civil unions.

In 2015, the Church in Wales discussed same-sex marriages and "more than half of its Governing Body voted in favour of [same-sex marriage]". However, due to the need for a 2/3 majority to amend the marriage canon, the Bench of Bishops decided to approve "a series of prayers which may be said with a couple following the celebration of a civil partnership or civil marriage". The prayers, in Form One, give thanks  "for [the partners] who have found such love and companionship in each other, that it has led them to dedicate their lives in support of one another."

On 7 September 2021 in a historical vote the Church in Wales allowed blessings for same-sex marriages. The first such blessing took place at St Collen's Church, Llangollen, Denbighshire in November 2021.

Australia 
For some years, the Anglican Church of Australia has debated the blessing of same-sex marriages. Currently, the church has no official position on homosexuality. However, due to the church's position on marriage, the Primate and Archbishop of Melbourne, Philip Freier, stated in an ad clerum that clergy cannot perform a same-sex marriage and that "clergy are required to ask their episcopate bishop for guidance as to how to act in specific pastoral circumstances concerning same-sex weddings and celebrations". The Diocese of Wangaratta has voted to bless same-sex civil unions. In 2013, the Diocese of Perth voted in favour of recognising same-sex relationships. The Diocese of Gippsland has appointed an openly gay priest to serve within its parishes. St. Andrew's Church in Subiaco, Perth has blessed a same-sex union. In 2018, Peter McLeod-Miller, an archdeacon, "conducted an unofficial hand-clasping ceremony at [a same-sex wedding]." In 2020, the Apellate Tribunal, the highest church court for the denomination, ruled that a diocese may allow the blessing of same-sex civil marriages.

Anglican Church in Aotearoa, New Zealand and Polynesia 
In 2014, the general synod of the Anglican Church in Aotearoa, New Zealand and Polynesia passed a resolution that will create a pathway towards the blessing of same-sex relationships. In the meantime, while blessing rites are being developed, "clergy should be permitted 'to recognise in public worship' a same-gender civil union or state marriage of members of their faith community."

In the Auckland Diocese, there are congregations that may offer a "relationship blessing" for two partners. In 2005, a same-sex couple was joined in a civil union at St. Matthew in the City in the Auckland diocese. The Dunedin diocese also provides a blessing for the relationship of "two people" irrespective of gender. In the Waiapu Diocese the bishop's chaplain has also performed a blessing for a same-sex couple. In May 2018 the general synod of the Anglican Church allowed blessing of same-sex marriages.

Anglican Church of Southern Africa 
Some churches in Africa, "where homosexuals can be legally ordained", "are joining the trend, including the Anglican church in South Africa formerly led by Archbishop Desmond Tutu". The denomination also has no official position on homosexuality. At the same time, in 2016, "Anglican bishops from across southern Africa have resolved that gay and lesbian partners who enter same-sex civil unions under South African law should be welcomed into congregations as full members of the church". In 2016, the Diocese of Saldanha Bay proposed a motion for the "blessing of same-sex civil unions..." While the 2016 motion did not pass, the Diocese of Cape Town tabled a motion urging the bishops "to finalise guidelines on how its leaders should respond to same-sex partnerships of a 'faithful commitment,'..." Archbishop Thabo Makgoba set up, in 2017,  a working committee "… to amend Canon 34 which will enable ministry to those in Same Sex Unions and the LGBTI Community in the context in which ACSA operates in Southern Africa."

Priests in Saldanha Bay have stated that they will unofficially bless same-sex unions. The Diocese of Pretoria joined Saldanha Bay in supporting same-sex relationships. Much earlier, in 2009, the Cape Town synod voted to "provide pastoral care to gay and lesbian members in 'faithful, committed' same-sex partnerships." In 2018, the Diocese of Saldanha Bay became the first diocese in the Anglican Church of Southern Africa to officially vote for the blessing of same-sex civil unions. In 2023, the Synod of Bishops agreed to develop prayers that may be said with same-sex couples, but they did not approve of blessings or marriage for same-sex couples.

Episcopal Anglican Church of Brazil 
The Episcopal Anglican Church of Brazil permits the ordination of gay and lesbian priests and the blessing of same-sex relationships. In 2016, an Extraordinary Synod drafted a proposal for the General Synod of 2017 to amend the marriage canon to include same-sex marriage. On 1 June 2018 the General Synod voted to change the marriage canon to allow same-sex couples to get married.

Old Catholic, Reformed Catholic Churches and Liberal Catholic Church
Four churches of the Union of Utrecht, which shares full communion with the Anglican Churches through the Bonn Agreement, also permit such blessings: namely, Old Catholic Church of the Netherlands (the mother church) permits blessings of gay civil marriages, and the Christian Catholic Church of Switzerland, and Catholic Diocese of the Old Catholics in Germany permit blessings of homosexual civil unions. The Old Catholic Church of Austria also permits such blessings. Because of this (as well as the ordination of women), the Polish National Catholic Church seceded from the Union in 2003.

Many smaller denominations, such as the Eucharistic Catholic Church, the Old Catholic Church (in Sweden) and TOCCUSA also solemnize same-sex marriages.

The Old Catholic Church, Province of the United States (TOCCUSA) is a Catholic denomination founded on the ecclesiology of the Old Catholics of the Union of Utrecht.  Old Catholics are progressive when it comes to social issues, yet maintain the rich tradition of the sacramental nature of the Catholic Church. All seven sacraments of the Church are open to any baptized Catholic Christian.  For TOCCUSA, the sacramental nature of same-sex marriages is recognized, thus ensuring that there is no distinction  between the marriages of two persons of the same gender or two persons of opposite genders.  Couples wishing to marry must undergo some pre-marital counseling before the marriage rite takes place.

Austria

Evangelical Church in Austria
Evangelical Lutheran Free Church
Reformed Church in Austria (since 1998/since 2019 blessing of marriages)

Belgium

 United Protestant Church in Belgium

Canada

The Evangelical Lutheran Church in Canada has permitted the blessing of same-sex unions since July 2011. The Lutheran Church–Canada does not permit the blessing of same-sex unions. The LC-C stance is consonant with that of its American sister church, the Lutheran Church–Missouri Synod.

The governing council of The United Church of Canada welcomes same-sex marriage, but individual United Church congregations are responsible for making decisions locally. Marriages are performed with the permission and under the responsibility of the local congregation.

Denmark
In November 2011, the Government of Denmark announced that there will be same-sex religious marriage available in the Church of Denmark as part of the broader legislative move to recognise same-sex marriage. A similar debate is currently underway in the Church of Iceland following legislation to permit same-sex marriage in Iceland.

The Church of Denmark (in full communion with the Anglican Churches of the British Isles through the Porvoo Communion) now performs blessings of same-sex couples.

Finland 
The Evangelical Lutheran Church of Finland approved special prayers for same-sex couples following a civil union or marriage. The archbishop, who supported the prayers, "called for the church to take a clear and unequivocal stance in support of gay and lesbian couples". Some bishops are willing to ordain gay and lesbian pastors. Marriage is by church law still defined as a union between one man and one woman, changing the law would require a 3/4 majority vote among church council voters.

France
The United Protestant Church of France performs blessings of same-sex marriages.
The Union of Protestant Churches of Alsace and Lorraine allowed blessings of same-sex marriages in November 2019.

Luxembourg 
Both the Protestant Reformed Church of Luxembourg and the Protestant Church of Luxembourg allow the blessing of same-sex marriages.

Germany

All 20 Lutheran, United and Reformed churches within the Evangelical Church in Germany perform blessings of same-sex marriages.
On November 9, 2019 Union of Evangelical Churches allowed blessing of same-sex marriages.

Protestant Church in Hesse and Nassau
Protestant Church of Bremen
Protestant Lutheran State Church of Brunswick
Evangelical Lutheran Church of Hanover
Evangelical Lutheran Church in Northern Germany
 former North Elbian Evangelical Church
Evangelical Lutheran Church in Oldenburg
Evangelical Church of Berlin-Brandenburg-Silesian Upper Lusatia
Protestant Church of Westphalia
Protestant Church of the Palatinate
Evangelical Church in the Rhineland
Evangelical Church in Central Germany
Evangelical Church of Hesse Electorate-Waldeck
Evangelical Reformed Church in Bavaria and Northwestern Germany
Church of Lippe
Evangelical Church of Anhalt
Protestant Church in Baden
Evangelical-Lutheran Church of Saxony
Evangelical Lutheran Church in Bavaria
Evangelical-Lutheran Church in Württemberg
Evangelical Lutheran Church of Schaumburg-Lippe

Iceland
Within the Church of Iceland, the blessing of same-sex couples is allowed.

Italy
The Waldensian Evangelical Church became the first Italian Christian denominations to state its support to same-sex couples in 2010.

The Lutheran Evangelical Church in Italy supports same-sex couples and allowed blessings of same-sex unions in 2011.

Norway
In 2013, the Church of Norway allowed blessing of same-sex unions. In a synod-meeting on the 11th of April 2016 the Church of Norway formally allowed same-sex marriages in their churches and announced the commencement of work on a liturgy for same-sex marriages.

Philippines

The Metropolitan Community Church of Quezon City (MCCQC), Metropolitan Community Church Makati (MCCMPH), and Metropolitan Community Church of Metro Baguio (MCCMB) officiate Holy Unions for same-sex partners in the Philippines. The Metropolitan Community Church is an Ecumenical Christian Church for all people, with a special ministry to gays, lesbians, bisexuals and transgender people; it advocates for equality and social justice. Its affiliations in The Philippines are the following: MCC Quezon City, MCC Makati, MCC Metro Baguio, MCC Olongapo, and MCC Marikina.

Sweden
The Church of Sweden performs blessings of same-sex couples. Following the legalization of same-sex marriage in Sweden in May 2009, the Church of Sweden decided in October 2009 to start conducting same-sex weddings in their churches. It had previously blessed same-sex couples using a different ceremony.

Reformed churches in Switzerland 
Most of the reformed churches in Federation of Swiss Protestant Churches perform blessings for same-sex couples, for example 
 Reformed Church of Aargau
 Reformed Churches of the Canton Bern-Jura-Solothurn
 Evangelical-Reformed Church of Graubünden
 Evangelical Reformed Church of the Canton of Lucerne
 Evangelical Reformed Church of the Canton of St. Gallen 
 Evangelical Reformed Church of the Canton of Schaffhausen
 Chiesa evangelica riformata nel Ticino
 Evangelical Church of the Canton of Thurgau
 Evangelical Reformed Church of the Canton of Vaud
 Evangelical Reformed Church of the Canton of Zürich

In August 2019, the blessing of same-sex marriages is allowed in Swiss Reformed Church.

United States
The Evangelical Lutheran Church in America began officially allowing blessings of same-sex couples in late August, 2009—though there were no explicit prohibitions before this point.  Studies and dialogue had been under way during the past decade and continued until the 2009 Churchwide Assembly, during which the ELCA passed a resolution by a vote of 619–402 reading "Resolved, that the ELCA commit itself to finding ways to allow congregations that choose to do so to recognize, support and hold publicly accountable lifelong, monogamous, same-gender relationships." That Assembly also affirmed that sexual orientation, in itself, is not to be a qualification or exclusion for ordained ministry. As marriage policy is a congregation matter in the ELCA, same-sex partnership blessings and marriages had been performed by many Lutheran pastors prior to the 2009 actions. In 1993 the ELCA Conference of Bishops stated it did not approve of such ceremonies, but made no comment about same-sex marriage.  (The Conference of Bishops is an advisory body of the ELCA.)

Lutheran congregations which so choose may register their public affirmation for gay, lesbian, bisexual, and transgender people may register with Lutherans Concerned/North America, a church advocacy group, as "Reconciling in Christ." This registry includes not only congregations, but synods, organizations, Lutheran colleges, campus ministries, social ministry institutions, Lutheran health care organizations, campus ministries, church colleges, regional synods and districts, and other groups which openly welcome gays and lesbians in their communities. The national Lutheran organization which advocates for equality for gays and lesbians inside and outside the church was known as "Lutherans Concerned North America" until 2012, when they changed their name to "ReconcilingWorks: Lutherans for Full Participation". Founded in 1974 Local chapters are found throughout the US and Canada.

In 2015, after the Supreme Court legalized same-sex marriage nationally in the US, the office of the presiding bishop released a letter informing members that each congregation is free to marry gay and lesbian couples or to choose not to do so.

The Reformed Church of America (RCA) allows blessings of same-sex marriages and ordination of homosexual reverends, as for example Rev. Ursula Cargill in New Jersey, but debates have split the church for years and not all congregations recognize this position.

Presbyterian polities

Church of Scotland

The 2006 General Assembly of the Church of Scotland voted that blessing civil partnerships should be a matter of conscience for individual ministers. Conservatives in the Kirk argued that the reform would have to be ratified by local presbyteries under the Barrier Act. When the 45 Presbyteries were consulted, only nine voted in favour of allowing ministers to bless civil-partnered (same-sex) couples, and the remaining 36 were against the innovation. Therefore, it was defeated, and is due to be addressed again at the 2013 General Assembly. At its 2011 General Assembly, the Church of Scotland voted to allow openly gay and lesbian Ministers and Diaconal ministers who live in civil unions, provided that they were already ordained and had declared their sexuality before the Scott Rennie case on 23 May 2009.  There remains, however, a Moratorium  on accepting those in same-sex relationships for training, ordination or induction into the Ministry or Diaconate, which may be lifted by the General Assembly of 2013.
When asked to respond to the Scottish Government's consultation on same-sex marriage, the Church's Legal Questions Committee submitted a response which upheld a biblical and traditional understanding of marriage as a voluntary lifelong union between one man and one woman (December 2011).  After this, the Church's first openly gay minister, Revd. Scott Rennie, claimed to the press that such ostracisation of homosexuals will empty churches.

In 2016, the General Assembly voted in favor of allowing ministers to enter into same-sex marriages. On 25 May 2017, the General Assembly voted in favor of allowing same-sex marriages in Church of Scotland. In May 2018, the General Assembly passed a vote by 345 to 170, for a motion which tasked a committee with drafting church law on the issue of same-sex marriage. Its Legal Questions Committee has been asked to report back to the decision-making body in 2020. In May 2022 the General Assembly approved the celebration of same-sex marriage in the Church of Scotland.

Presbyterian Church in Ireland 
In May 2006, a church spokesperson announced that clergy could bless same-gender partnerships. However, that announcement was reversed by General Assembly when it voted to ban its ministers from blessing same-gender partnerships in June 2006. The Presbyterian Church in Ireland is currently strongly opposed to same-sex marriage.

Presbyterian Church (USA)
The Presbyterian Church USA General Assembly Permanent Judicial Commission ruled in 2006 that same-sex ceremonies are not forbidden, as long as they are not considered to be the same as marriage services.  Debate on the issue within the church evolved over the years. In 2000, the General Assembly had approved language for the church constitution that stated church teachings were that people were "to live either in fidelity within the covenant of marriage between a man and a woman or in chastity in singleness," and barred church officers and property from being used for blessing or approval upon any other form of fidelity relationship, but ratification for this language was never obtained by the presbyteries. By 2014, the General Assembly passed an Authoritative Interpretation permitting pastors to sign marriage licences for same-gender couples where permitted by civil law in the states where their church was found, which took immediate effect.

On March 17, 2015, ratification by a majority of presbyteries was reached on a constitutional amendment passed by that same 2014 General Assembly, which broadened the definition of marriage in the Directory for Worship from only being between "a man and a woman," to "two people, traditionally a man and a woman," thus giving official sanction to, while not making it mandatory for, any congregation's pastor to preside over and bless marriage ceremonies for same-gender couples.

Connexional polities

Methodism
There are a variety of responses within Methodism some of which have been favorable to a greater or lesser extent to same-sex unions or marriages.

Methodist Church of Great Britain 
In 2005, the Methodist Church of Great Britain voted to allow a local option for ministers who wish to perform same-sex blessings, with a Church spokesperson stating that "We have decided, with the law changing in December, we as a Church need to provide guidance to our ministers, who will be allowed to take an individual decision as to whether or not they want to bless gay couples."  In 2006, the Church reversed its decision and prohibited the blessing of same-sex unions on or off church property.

In 2014, the church allowed ministers to enter into same-sex marriages and to offer blessing services for same-sex couples in civil marriages. In 2021, the Methodist Church's conference overwhelmingly voted to allow the marriage of same-sex couples in Methodist churches and by Methodist ministers. Methodists may affirm one of two parallel definitions of marriage: "only between a man and a woman" or "between any two people". No minister shall be compelled to perform same-sex marriages.

United Methodist Church 
On May 7, 2018, the Bishops in the United Methodist Church, a denomination long divided on questions of LGBT equality, have proposed allowing individual pastors and regional church bodies to decide whether to ordain LGBT clergy and perform same-sex weddings.
The United Methodist Church prohibited until 2018 celebrations of same-sex unions by its elders and in its churches. However, while "clergy cannot preside over the wedding ceremony...bishops say, clergy can assist same-gender couples in finding other venues for their wedding; provide pre-marital counseling; attend the ceremony; read Scripture, pray or offer a homily". Moreover, the church approved spousal benefits for non-ordained employees in same-sex marriages in states that allow such marriages.

The church does not nationally allow the ordination of gay or lesbian pastors, but some Jurisdictions and Annual Conferences have begun to ordain gay and lesbian pastors and same-sex marriages or have passed resolutions supporting such ceremonies. The Baltimore-Washington, California-Nevada, California-Pacific, Desert Southwest, Detroit, Greater New Jersey, Great Plains, Illinois Great Rivers, Iowa, Minnesota, New England, New York, Northern Illinois, Oregon-Idaho, Pacific Northwest, Rocky Mountain, Southwest Texas, Upper New York, Virginia, West Michigan, and Wisconsin Annual Conferences have passed resolutions supporting same-sex couples or the ordination of gay and lesbian clergy.

In 2016, the New York Annual Conference ordained the denomination's first openly gay and lesbian clergy. Following those ordinations, the Western Jurisdiction elected and consecrated the church's first openly gay and partnered bishop., for example Karen Oliveto and Cedrick Bridgeforth.

African Methodist Episcopal Church 
The African Methodist Episcopal Church, which is in full communion with the UMC, currently prohibits its ministers from officiating same-sex weddings, but it does not have an official policy on gay pastors and, therefore, gay ministers have been ordained in the AME.

Evangelical Methodist Church in Argentina 
The Evangelical Methodist Church in Argentina allows "the freedom to accompany homosexual couples" in ministry. Each congregation is, therefore, free to determine its own policy.

Evangelical Methodist Church in Uruguay 
The Evangelical Church in Uruguay, a Methodist denomination, has "resolved that pastors that wish to minister to homosexuals may do so freely". Each pastor is free to provide blessing services for same-sex unions if he or she chooses to do so.

Methodist Church of New Zealand 
In 2004, the Methodist Church of New Zealand approved the ordination of gay and lesbian clergy; each congregation is able to determine its own position on the issue.

Congregational polities
Rev. Lori Walke, associate pastor at Mayflower Congregational Church, said she officiated 50 same-sex weddings in one year.

Pastor Joe Cobb of Metropolitan Community Church has officiated 50 same-sex weddings.

Baptist Churches
Some Baptist denominations in the United States do not have official beliefs about marriage in a confession of faith and invoke congregationalism to leave the choice to each church to decide.  This is the case of American Baptist Churches USA, Progressive National Baptist Convention, Cooperative Baptist Fellowship and National Baptist Convention, USA.

Some Baptist denominations supports same-sex marriage. The Alliance of Baptists (USA),  the Aliança de Batistas do Brasil,  the Fraternidad de Iglesias Bautistas de Cuba,   and the Association of Welcoming and Affirming Baptists (international).

Quakers 
The first recorded same-sex marriage by a Quaker meeting in the US was in 1987. In January, 1987, Morningside Monthly Meeting of the Society of Friends, in the Morningside Heights neighborhood of New York City, became the first Quaker Meeting to treat same-sex marriage and opposite-sex marriage equally, and the first to take a same-sex marriage (using the word marriage, rather than "commitment ceremony") under its care with the marriage of John Bohne and William McCann on May 30, 1987.

Same-sex couples have been married under the care of many "unprogrammed" Quaker meetings in Canada since 1992. In Australia, Canberra Quaker meeting celebrated the marriage of two gay men on 15 April 2007. Australian Quakers are prepared to celebrate same-sex marriages despite the lack of legal recognition. See Quaker views of homosexuality

In 2009, the Yearly Meeting of the Religious Society of Friends (Quakers) in Great Britain, the Channel Islands and the Isle of Man decided to authorise same-sex marriage, having previously performed blessings for same-sex civil partnerships. In Australia,  the 2010 Yearly Meeting called on the Federal Government to amend the Australian Marriage Act to give full and equal legal recognition to all marriages, regardless of the sexual orientation and gender of the partners. Australian Quakers had been blessing same-sex unions since 1994. 
The Canada Yearly Meeting stated in 2003 that Canadian Quakers "support the right of same-sex couples to a civil marriage and the extension of the legal definition of marriage to include same-sex couples." Since then a number of same-sex marriages have been performed at Canadian Monthly Meetings.  In New Zealand, the Aotearoa Quaker Meeting in 1995 pledged "to seek formal ways of recognizing a variety of commitments, including gay and lesbian partnerships."

United Church of Christ
Varies by church. The General Synod of the United Church of Christ has passed a resolution affirming "equal marriage rights for couples regardless of gender and declares that the government should not interfere with couples regardless of gender who choose to marry and share fully and equally in the rights, responsibilities and commitment of legally recognized marriage". At its 25th General Synod in 2005, the UCC passed the resolution, "Equal Marriage Rights for All". However, the polity of the UCC is congregationalist, so of each church has a different way of operating. (The General Synod does not have authority over Local Churches to determine or enforce denominational doctrine)

Canadian Unitarian Council

Canadian Unitarian churches perform same-sex marriage as well.

Unitarian Universalist Association

Unitarian Universalists perform same-sex marriages, and have supported marriage equality since 1973, reaffirming with a formal resolution in 1996.

Metropolitan Community Church
The predominantly gay Universal Fellowship of Metropolitan Community Churches performs same-sex marriages.

Mennonite Church
The Mennonite Church in the Netherlands offers marriage to both heterosexual and same-gender couples.

The Mennonite Church Canada offers marriage to both heterosexual and same-gender couples.

Remonstrants
The Remonstrants perform weddings for both heterosexual and same-sex couples.

Pentecostalism
Most Pentecostal churches do not affirm gay marriage.

The Affirming Pentecostal Church International and the Global Alliance of Affirming Apostolic Pentecostals are US based denominations of Oneness Pentecostals that will perform weddings for both heterosexual and same-sex couples.

Christian Church (Disciples of Christ) 
In mainline Christian Church (Disciples of Christ) blessing of same-sex unions are allowed.

Mixed-polity and other polity

Moravian Church (North America) 
The Moravian Church in North America's Northern Province has passed several liberal resolutions on homosexuality, but has not yet been able to "address the issue of a marriage covenant between homosexual persons".

Swedenborgianism
The Swedenborgian Church of North America allows ministers to choose whether to perform same-sex marriages. Ministers of the General Church of the New Jerusalem are not permitted to marry or bless same-sex unions.

New Apostolic Church 
Since 2011 in Europe the New Apostolic Church allows blessings in a prayer for same-sex unions.

Uniting and uniting churches

Australia
In Australia the Uniting Church in Australia allows blessing of same-sex unions. On 13 July 2018, the Uniting Church in Australia voted by national Assembly to approve the creation of official marriage rites for same-sex couples.

Netherlands
The Protestant Church in the Netherlands has chosen not to address marriage in its post-merger canon law; however, the by-laws of the church allow for the blessing of relationships outside of marriage.

Canada
Due to its "local option", a number of congregations and ministers of the United Church of Canada (a merger of Congregationalist, Presbyterian and Methodist congregations in Canada following presbyterian polity) officiate at same-sex marriages, which are fully legal in Canada.

United Kingdom
In 2011, the United Reformed Church allowed blessings of same-sex couples. In July 2016, the United Reformed Church allowed same-sex marriage.

Churches with policies that distinguish between same-sex unions and marriage
By nature of this religious understanding of marriage, when churches use the term "Union" in a same-sex blessing ceremony, they may or may not be blessing this union in an equivalent way as they would bless a "marriage" as opposed to blessing the commitment between the two individuals. Some Christian bodies are exploring the manner in which same-sex couples could or should be blessed (or not) by the church. Because same-sex religious unions are not widespread and because civil unions do not require religious officiation, documentation of the incidence of church blessing of same-sex couples is difficult.

Roman Catholic Church 
During the 1990s, a discussion began in the Roman Catholic Church about blessings for same-sex unions. Central teaching remains clear that such unions can in no ways be sanctioned by the Catholic Church. However, there are instances when individual priests carry out informal blessings. They risk being disciplined if the blessing is discovered. Notable numbers of clerics have openly disobeyed this teaching:

In the Roman Catholic Diocese of Aachen in Germany, five same-sex unions received a blessing in German town of Mönchengladbach. 
In 2007, one same-sex union received a blessing in German town of Wetzlar in the Roman Catholic Diocese of Limburg. 
In October 2014 a blessing of a same-sex union took place in Bürglen, Uri, Switzerland. The priest subsequently made a public apology. 
A blessing of a same-sex union took place by a Catholic Dominican priest in Malta in 2015.
In May 2015 the Central Committee of German Catholics voted in favour of blessing of same-sex unions. 
 In 2015, Belgian bishop Johan Bonny from Roman Catholic Diocese of Antwerp in Antwerpen supported blessing of same-sex marriages.
 In 2017, the association We are Church supported blessing of same-sex marriages.
In January 2018 German bishop Franz-Josef Bode of the Roman Catholic Diocese of Osnabrück said in an interview with German journalists, that the blessing of same-sex unions is possible in German Roman Catholic churches.
In February 2018, Cardinal Reinhard Marx, Archbishop of Munich and Freising and chairman of the German Bishops' Conference, said in an interview with German journalists that the blessing of same-sex unions is possible in German Roman Catholic churches. In Austria blessing of same-sex unions are allowed in Roman Catholic Diocese of Linz.
In Austria the Parish Priests Initiative led by Father Helmut Schueller is blessing same-sex unions in defiance of the pope.  The group gave a statement which included, "We members of the Parish Priests Initiative are deeply appalled by the new Roman decree that seeks to prohibit the blessing of same-sex loving couples. This is a relapse into times that we had hoped to have overcome with Pope Francis."
In the Roman Catholic Diocese of Aachen over fifty blessings of same-sex unions have been held in recent years. 
In the German Roman Catholic Archdiocese of Paderborn blessings of same-sex unions were allowed in Dortmund.
 In September 2019, in the Swiss Roman Catholic Diocese of Basel blessings of same-sex marriages were allowed by bishop Felix Gmür.
 In May 2020, Austrian Roman Catholic theologian Ewald Volgger published, with the support of Roman Catholic bishop Franz Lackner, a book The benediction of same sex partnerships with liturgical advice, how a rite for blessings of same-sex partnerships might be conducted.
 In April/June 2020 Roman Catholic German bishops Helmut Dieser from Roman Catholic Diocese of Aachen and Georg Bätzing from Roman Catholic Diocese of Limburg said that blessings of same-sex unions in Roman Catholic church should be allowed.
 In September 2020, bishop Heinrich Timmerevers of the Roman Catholic Diocese of Dresden-Meissen supported blessing of same-sex marriages in the Roman Catholic church.
 In February 2021, bishop Peter Kohlgraf from Roman Catholic Diocese of Mainz supported the blessing of same-sex marriages in Roman Catholic church.
 On March 15, 2021, the Congregation for the Doctrine of the Faith, under the approval of Pope Francis, released a response to a "dubium", in which it clarified that the Catholic Church does not have the power to give liturgical blessings of homosexual unions. In an accompanying note, it stated: "it is not licit to impart a blessing on relationships, or partnerships, even stable, that involve sexual activity outside of marriage (i.e., outside the indissoluble union of a man and a woman open in itself to the transmission of life), as is the case of the unions between persons of the same sex."
 In March 2021, Roman-Catholic bishop Franz-Josef Overbeck supported blessings for same-sex unions.
 On March 22, 2021, Roman-Catholic archbishop Ludwig Schick from Roman Catholic Archdiocese of Bamberg supported blessings of same-sex marriages.
 From May 16, 2021, many Roman Catholic churches in Germany planned to hold blessings of same-sex marriages in open defiance of the Holy See.  The head of the German Bishops Conference has spoken against gay blessings but the lay organisation, the Central Committee of German Catholics, is in favour. This is part of a widespread movement for reform in German Roman Catholic churches.
 During the week of May 23, 2021, about 120 German priests held blessings including blessings of same-sex unions.  Others in relationships the Church regards as sinful, such as attempted remarriage without a declaration of nullity, were also blessed; women preached from pulpits, which is prohibited by the teachings of the Catholic Church.
 In May 2021, the CBC News reported that Catholic priests in Germany have been secretly blessing same-sex unions for years.
 In June 2021, German bishop Bertram Meier from Roman Catholic Diocese of Augsburg in Augsburg in Bavaria supported blessings for same-sex marriages.
 On 1 October 2021, a great majority of German Roman-Catholic bishops and laity supported at the Synodal Path in a document blessings of same-sex marriages.
 In February 2022, German bishop Karl-Heinz Wiesemann supported blessings for same-sex marriages.
 On May 11, 2022 again in more than 100 Roman-Catholic churches in Germany blessings of same-sex marriages were celebrated, for example in the Roman-Catholic cathedral in Magdeburg, and in Essen was first time a Roman-Catholic bishop with Ludger Schepers at place.
On September 20, 2022, the Belgian Bishops' Conference issued a document allowing the blessing of same-sex unions, suggesting a ritual that included a prayer and a benediction for stable same-sex unions. But it stressed that it was not "what the Church understands by a sacramental marriage".
 On March 11, 2023, the Synodal Path with support of over 80 percentage of Roman Catholic bishops called for blessing ceremonies for same-sex couples in the German Roman Catholic dioceses.
 After the Synodal Path first German dioceses started blessing ceremonies for same-sex couples in March 2023, for example Roman Catholic Diocese of Osnabrück.

Churches with no policy on the unions
The United Church of Christ has no formal rules requiring or prohibiting solemnization of wedding vows, but owing to its Congregational polity and constitution, each Local Church is "autonomous in the management of its own affairs" and has the "right to operate in the way customary to it"; it cannot be "abridge[d] or impair[ed]" by other UCC agencies, and so each congregation has the freedom to bless or prohibit any kind of marriage or relationship in whatever way they discern appropriate. Thus a congregation may choose at their discretion to solemnise same-sex marriages, to bless same-sex unions, or refuse to perform any ceremony for same-sex couples, or refuse to perform any kind of marriage for anyone. There are no available statistics on how many UCC congregations solemnize same-sex relationships, but there are documented cases where this happens and documented cases where congregations have taken stands against marriage between same-gender couples.

Among Baptists, The American Baptist Churches USA allows each congregation to decide for itself. Also, "the National Baptist Convention USA Inc. does not have an "official" position on any issues with regards to homosexuality". Each congregation is autonomous in the National Baptist Convention USA Inc. Likewise, the Cooperative Baptist Fellowship recognizes the autonomy of each local congregation on these issues.

The Christian Church (Disciples of Christ) allows each congregation to decide whether to perform same-sex marriages.

Literature 
 Christian Grethlein: Grundinformation Kasualien. Vandenhoeck & Ruprecht, Göttingen 2007, . Darin: Segnung anlässlich einer Eingetragenen Partnerschaft? p. 265f.
 Wolfgang Schürger: Segnung von gleichgeschlechtlichen Paaren. Bausteine und Erfahrungen. Gütersloher Verlagshaus. Gütersloh 2002. .
 Segnung von Paaren in eingetragener Lebenspartnerschaft. Materialien für den Gottesdienst (Evangelical Church of Hesse Electorate-Waldeck), Kassel 2013. 
 Die Feier der Partnerschaftssegnung im Katholischen Bistum der Alt-Katholiken in Deutschland, Für den gottesdienstlichen Gebrauch erarbeitet durch die Liturgische Kommission und herausgegeben von Bischof und Synodalvertretung, Alt-Katholischer Bistumsverlag, Bonn 2014, .
 Paare.Riten.Kirche. Arbeitsgemeinschaft für römisch-katholische Familienbildung (akf). Germany 2020,

See also

Adelphopoiesis ("brother-making")
List of Christian denominational positions on homosexuality
List of Christian denominations affirming LGBT
Status of same-sex marriage
Marriage privatization
LGBT-affirming religious groups

References

Further reading
 Text of the Liturgy
 Anglican Communion – On public Rites of Blessing of same-sex unions
 The Episcopal Church USA General Convention 2003 – Publications
 (German) Evangelical Church in Hesse
 Decision for blessing in Evangelical Lutheran Church in Northelbia (German)

External links
 The Ongoing Struggle within the Episcopal Church USA: ordination of openly gay bishops and the blessing of same-sex unions
 Statement from the Episcopal Bishop of New Hampshire on the blessing of same-sex Unions

LGBT and Christianity
Marriage in Christianity
Same-sex unions